Garowol  or Garawoll is a small town in eastern Gambia near the border with Senegal. It is located in Kantora District in the Upper River Division.  As of 2012, it has an estimated population of 8,124.

Jundala Forest Park is located nearby.

References

Populated places in the Gambia
Upper River Division